Edith E. DeLeon Guerrero is an American politician serving as a member of the Northern Mariana Islands Senate for the 3rd district. Elected in November 2020, she assumed office on January 11, 2021.

Life and career
In 2000, Governor Pedro Pangelinan Tenorio appointed her to the Marianas Public Land Trust. She was reappointed in 2004 by Governor Juan Babauta and served until 2006. In 2006, she became the director of the CNMI Workforce Investment Agency. She was a life insurance agent for a time for ten years prior to serving as the director of the Workforce Investment Agency.

In 2013, Governor Eloy Inos merged the Workforce Investment Agency and the Department of Labor. On October 3, 2013, Inos nominated DeLeon Guerrero, then Director if the Workforce Investment Agency, to serve as the Secretary of Labor. She was sworn in on December 26, 2013. Guerrero then served as secretary of the Northern Mariana Islands Department of Labor until 2017. 

Her father, Lorenzo I. De Leon Guerrero, was the 13th Governor of the Northern Mariana Islands.

CNMI Senate
In the 2020 general election, Guerrero defeated Republican incumbent Sixto K. Igisomar to become the first Democrat to win a Senate seat in Saipan since 2003. On January 10, 2023, DeLeon Guerrero became the first woman to serve as President of the Northern Mariana Islands Senate. She took over the position from Jude Hofschneider.

References 

Cabinet secretaries of the Northern Mariana Islands
Democratic Party (Northern Mariana Islands) politicians
Living people
Northern Mariana Islands Senators
Year of birth missing (living people)